A nunatak (from Inuit nunataq) is the summit or ridge of a mountain that protrudes from an ice field or glacier that otherwise covers most of the mountain or ridge. They are also called glacial islands. Examples are natural pyramidal peaks. When rounded by glacial action, smaller rock promontories may be referred to as rognons.

The word is of Greenlandic origin and has been used in English since the 1870s.

Description
The term is typically used in areas where a permanent ice sheet is present and the nunataks protrude above the sheet. Nunataks present readily identifiable landmark reference points in glaciers or ice caps and are often named. While some nunataks are isolated, sometimes they form dense clusters, such as Queen Louise Land in Greenland.

Nunataks are generally angular and jagged, which hampers the formation of glacial ice on their tops, although snow can accumulate on them. They usually contrast strongly with the softer contours of the glacially eroded land after a glacier retreats. Nunataks are not greatly affected by frost weathering given the low frequency of freeze-thaw cycles in areas of ice caps and ice sheets.

Typically nunataks are the only places where plant life can survive on ice sheets or ice caps. Lifeforms on nunataks are frequently isolated by the surrounding ice or glacier,  providing unique habitats.

List

Aitken Nunatak
Åkerlundh Nunatak
Allan Hills aka Allan Nunatak.
All-Blacks Nunataks
Altsek Nunatak
Anderson Nunataks
Anoritooq
Appalachia Nunataks
Arena Corner
Arkhangel'skiy Nunataks
Arrowhead Nunatak
Atanasoff Nunatak
Aviator Nunatak
Belknap Nunatak
Berg Mountains
Bering Nunatak
Bon Docteur Nunatak
Bradley Nunatak
Branson Nunatak
Brusilov Nunataks
Butcher Nunatak
Cabrera Nunatak
Calfee Nunatak
Cameron Nunataks
Canisp, formed as a Nunatak
Carapace Nunatak
Cassandra Nunatak
Castillo Nunatak
Castor Nunatak
Cat Nunatak
Catenary Nunatak
Cathedral Peak
C. H. Ostenfeld Nunatak
Chain Nunataks
Cheeks Nunatak
Chocolate Nunatak
Clem Nunatak
Cone Nunatak
Copper Nunataks
Cowie Nunatak
Crash Nunatak
Crosby Nunataks
Daniels Hill
Dean Nunataks
Dee Nunatak
Director Nunatak
Dodd Nunatak
Dome Nunatak
Dotten Nunatak
Dow Nunatak
Downs Nunatak
Drury Nunatak
Du Toit Nunataks
 Dziura Nunatak
Eaton Nunatak
Eckins Nunatak
Else Nunataks
Erehwon Nunatak
Erven Nunataks
Esther Nunatak
Everett Nunatak
Exile Nunatak
Exiles Nunataks
Fallone Nunataks
Faraway How
Farquharson Nunatak
Ferguson Nunataks
Fiebelman Nunatak
Filson Nunatak
Fin Nunatak
Florence Nunatak
Foltz Nunatak
Fomalhaut Nunatak
Footscrew Nunatak
Fraser Nunatak
Friedmann Nunataks
Galkin Nunatak
Gallen Nunatak
Gardner Nunatak
Gillett Nunataks
George Nunatak
Gomez Nunatak
Goodwin Nunataks
Gootee Nunatak
Gora Severny Nunatak
Gordon Nunataks
Gould Nunataks
Gratton Nunatak
Grayson Nunatak
Gromov Nunataks
Gronau Nunataks
Grossman Nunataks
Guardian Nunatak
Haigh Nunatak
Half Century Nunatak
Half Dome Nunatak
Halfway Nunatak
Hamner Nunatak
Harter Nunatak
Harvey Nunataks
Haupt Nunatak
Henry Nunataks
Herrmann Nunatak
Heuser Nunatak
Heverley Nunataks
Holt Nunatak
Hopalong Nunatak
Horne Nunataks
House Nunatak
Hutchins Nunataks
Jaques Nunatak
Jane Peak
Jarina Nunatak
John Nunatak
Johnson Nunataks
Jorgensen Nunataks
Jutulsessen
Kalafut Nunatak
Kamenev Nunatak
Kenfield Nunatak
Kinter Nunatak
Kjuklingen Nunatak
Klawatti Peak
Klinck Nunatak
Knight Nunatak
Koehler Nunatak
Komatsu Nunatak
Kozlov Nunataks
Krasin Nunataks
Krasnaya Nunatak
Krigsvold Nunataks
Kyle Nunataks
Lacroix Nunatak
Lands End Nunataks
Lang Nunatak
Laputa Nunataks
Last Cache Nunatak
Lawson Nunatak
Lawson Nunataks
Leach Nunatak
Lee Nunatak
Lepley Nunatak
Lewisohn Nunatak
Lilliput Nunataks
Lodalskåpa
Lonely One Nunatak
Lonewolf Nunataks
Longs Nunatak
López Nunatak
Luck Nunatak
Luff Nunatak
Luhrsen Nunatak
McCarthy Nunatak
McDaniel Nunatak
MacDonald Nunataks
McGrath Nunatak
McNair Nunatak
Maish Nunatak
Marcoux Nunatak
Marshall Nunatak
Martin Nunataks
Mathis Nunataks
Marujupu Peak
Meade Nunatak
Meyers Nunatak
Miller Nunatak
Miller Nunataks
Milles Nunatak
Mirfak Nunatak
Mizar Nunataks
Moody Nunatak
Moltke Nunataks
Moreland Nunatak
Morgan Nunataks
Morse Nunataks
Mulgrew Nunatak
Musson Nunatak
Neptune Nunataks
Névé Nunatak
Newman Nunataks
Nødtvedt Nunataks
Noble Nunatak
Nodule Nunatak
Nunatakassak
Nunatarsuaq
Nunatarsuaq (Tasiusaq Bay)
Olander Nunatak
Olson Nunatak
Omega Nunatak
Organpipe Nunatak
Orsugissap Qaqqarsua
Outrider Nunatak
Packsaddle Island
Papanin Nunataks
Pawley Nunataks
Pollux Nunatak
Potter Nunataks
Price Nunatak
Queen Louise Land
Quest Nunatak
Quilty Nunataks
R4D Nunatak
Ranney Nunatak
Rebholz Nunatak
Recess Nunatak
Rescue Nunatak
Reynolds Nunatak
Ringed Nunatak
Robertson Nunatak
Rutland Nunatak
Sage Nunataks
Salient Nunatak
Sanders Nunatak
Savin Nunatak
Sawyer Nunatak
Scheimpflug Nunatak
Schloredt Nunatak
Schoofs Nunatak
Seacatch Nunataks
See Nunatak
Sevier Nunatak
Shelton Nunataks
Ship Nunatak
Shoemake Nunatak
Singleton Nunatak
Slusher Nunatak
Småhausane Nunataks
Smørstabben Nunatak
Solitary Nunatak
Sonntag Nunatak
Spectator Nunatak
Stac Pollaidh, formed as a Nunatak
Stanford Nunatak
Starr Nunatak
Static Nunatak
Stewart Hills
Stinear Nunataks
Striated Nunatak
Suilven, formed as a Nunatak
Svarthamaren Mountain
Swarsen Nunatak
Swartz Nunataks
Symes Nunatak
Syningen Nunatak
Table Nunatak
Taurus Nunataks
Teltet Nunatak
Temnikow Nunataks
Tern Nunatak
Tester Nunatak
Themis Nunatak
Threshold Nunatak
Tomandl Nunatak
Tommeliten Rock
Tomovick Nunatak
Toth Nunataks
Trillingane Nunataks
Trioen Nunataks
Trubyatchinskiy Nunatak
Tuning Nunatak
Turret Nunatak
Tuttulikassak
Twin Nunataks
Utsteinen Nunatak
Varney Nunatak
Velchev Rock
Vesleskarvet
Velie Nunatak
Vesthaugen Nunatak
Vorta Nunatak
Vulcan Nunatak
Walker Nunatak
Wallis Nunataks
Walsh Nunatak
Wandel Land
Ward Nunataks
Watkins Range
Weather Guesser Nunataks
Weikman Nunataks
Whichaway Nunataks
Whistler Nunatak
White Nunataks
Wilds Nunatak
Willan Nunatak
Williams Nunatak
Willows Nunatak
Windscoop Nunataks
Witte Nunataks
Wold Nunatak
Wyers Nunataks
Yingling Nunatak
Young Nunataks
Zohn Nunataks

See also

References

External links

Nunatak survival of the high Alpine plant Eritrichium nanum

 
Glaciology
Nunatak